WLDB (93.3 FM "B93.3 FM") is a commercial radio station in Milwaukee, Wisconsin.  It is owned and operated by the Milwaukee Radio Alliance, a partnership between Shamrock Communications and All Pro Broadcasting.  WLDB airs an adult contemporary radio format.  Its studios are located in Menomonee Falls.

WLDB has an effective radiated power (ERP) of 16,000 watts.  The transmitter site is in Milwaukee's North Side off Humboldt Boulevard near Estabrook Park and the Milwaukee River.  WLDB broadcasts in the HD Radio hybrid format.  The HD2 digital subchannel carries sister station WZTI 1290 AM's oldies format.  It also feeds FM translator W262CJ 100.3 MHz, broadcasting from the same site as WLDB's transmitter.

History

Early years (1958-1973)
In 1958, WQFM signed on the air. The station had various formats, including classical music, big band music, jazz and ethnic programming, before the station tried an automated Top 40 format.

Rock (1973-1996) 
Starting in 1973, WQFM was Milwaukee's dominant album oriented rock station. The station competed with the eclectic free-form WZMF until 1979, and WLPX until 1983.

"93QFM" was the top rock station in town for over a decade, but faced its stiffest competition in 1987, when WBCS ended its country music format and became active rock "Lazer 103". Seeing Lazer 103 take away some listeners, WQFM shifted to a more heavy metal/hard rock direction, similar to that of Lazer.

In 1992, it switched to a more "adult rock" sound, then became heavier again. In addition, the station had a succession of morning shows over the years, including an ill-fated attempt at airing Wisconsin native Jonathon Brandmeier's show from WLUP in Chicago.  That backfired when WLUP shuffled its on-air lineup, moving Brandmeier to afternoons and put Kevin Matthews in morning drive time. At one point, WQFM put together one short-lived morning show that consisted of people who had never done radio, which included Lori Minetti, the hostess of the Wisconsin Lottery's Money Game television show and later, the host of WITI's Builder's Showcase.

Smooth jazz (1996-2007)
After years of falling ratings, on March 1, 1996, at 10:15 a.m., WQFM ended its rock format with "Long Live Rock" by The Who, and flipped to smooth jazz as WJZI. The first song under the new format was "I Wish" by Najee. The WQFM call letters were then transferred to a sister station in Scranton, Pennsylvania, WTZR, to prevent re-use by a Milwaukee competitor.

WJZI's smooth jazz format never dominated among Milwaukee radio listeners, but remained competitive in the middle portion of the Arbitron ratings. In the winter of 2005, the station tied for 9th place with WJMR among listeners 25 to 54, but rose to 7th place in the winter of 2006.

On March 5, 2007, WJZI began a transition in its format, gearing the station towards a slightly younger female demographic. This involved adding more adult contemporary music.  De-emphasizing the smooth jazz instrumental music that was a staple of the station, WJZI changed its branding to "Smooth 93.3," as it slowly began to make the transition to full-fledged soft rock.

By June 18, 2007, the transition was complete, with revamped on-air imaging, station logo and website.  It called itself "The All New Smooth 93.3."  A new morning show was added, featuring Milwaukee radio veteran Ellen Stout and station program director Stan Atkinson.  Competing station WFMR changed its format from classical music to smooth jazz on June 26, one week after WJZI's move. That station changed its call sign to WJZX.

Adult contemporary (2007-present)
On July 30, 2007, WJZI adopted new positioning, changing its call letters to WLDB, with the new moniker "B93.3".  This matched the imaging used by a popular station with the same format in Philadelphia, WBEB.  The station uses the decimal number to avert confusion with Sheboygan's country-formatted WBFM, which likewise brands as "B93.7" and has fringe reception in the central reaches of Ozaukee County. The station's weather forecasts are prepared and delivered by WDJT-TV's weather staff.

In June 2009, WLDB tweaked its format from soft AC to mainstream AC, playing music from the 1980s, 1990s, and the 2000s. This type of format was on WKTI before it flipped to an adult hits format and changed its call sign to WLWK-FM in November 2008. WLDB was attempting to compete with Hot AC WMYX-FM, although "The Mix" plays more new music than old.  As of 2011, the station played music from the 1970s through the present. The station's schedule all weekend between 5 PM on Fridays and 5 AM on Mondays consisted solely of 80s music.

The station rebranded as "Trending Radio 93.3" at 6:07 p.m. on April 1, 2015, after playing You Gotta Be by Des'ree, a title playing as a pun for a skit which followed where the station's former bee mascot was swatted to cue the branding change. The first song on "Trending Radio" was Let's Get It Started by The Black Eyed Peas. The playlist was then tightened towards more current and recent hits, focusing on competing more with WMYX, along with WXSS and WRNW to a lesser extent.

On February 23, 2016, at 3 p.m., after playing "Royals" by Lorde, WLDB returned to its former adult contemporary format and "B93.3" branding, though lacking the "bee" elements and mascot. The first song after the relaunch was "Don't Stop Believin'" by Journey.

Christmas music
In previous years, the station usually has only had intermittent Christmas music in the period between Thanksgiving and mid-December, then all Christmas for a couple of weeks leading to the holiday, but since 2016, has raced WRIT-FM in converting in mid-November. In 2016, the station went all-Christmas on November 17, beating WRIT-FM for the first time.

References

External links
WLDB official website
93QFM: The Halcyon Daze
Tribute page on Facebook

Image of classic WQFM billboard
Milwaukee Journal Sentinel'' articles from March 2007
June 2007 on WJZI's change to "Smooth 93.3"

Radio stations established in 1958
LDB
Hot adult contemporary radio stations in the United States
1958 establishments in Wisconsin